Canon Computer Systems, Inc. (CCSI), sometimes shortened to Canon Computer, was an American subsidiary of Canon Inc. formed in 1992 to develop and market the parent company's personal computers and workstations. The subsidiary also assumed the responsibility of marketing Canon's printers and photocopiers, which were formerly sold by other Canon divisions. It went defunct in January 2001.

History
Canon entered the computer industry in the 1970s, starting with the AX-1 in October 1978. It sported the form factor of a desktop calculator and was fully programmable. This was followed up with the AS-100 in 1982, which was a more-traditional albeit heavier personal computer that ran a Intel 8088 and ran MS-DOS. Canon entered the home computer market in 1984 with the V-20 and V-10 in 1984 and 1985 respectively. In 1987, the company released the Canon Cat—the brainchild of Jef Raskin who pioneered Apple's original Macintosh. In 1989, the company took a large stake in NeXT, a computer hardware company founded by Steve Jobs in 1987 after he resigned as CEO of Apple in the mid-1980s.

In April 1992, Canon spun off their computer manufacturing into Canon Computer Systems, a new subsidiary that also assumed the responsibility of marketing their parent company's printers and photocopiers. The subsidiary initially comprised 100 employees in October 1992, 50 based in Costa Mesa, California. Yasuhiro Tsubota, who founded Epson America in 1978, was named president. Several other higher-ups came from Epson America; Tsubota left Epson for NeXT 1990, to serve as a consultant for Jobs. The subsidiary's first offerings were a line of desktop computers and notebooks, branded as the Innova and Innova Book respectively. The company expected $125 million in revenue by October 1993. They allocated $10 million of their initial budget on advertising, hiring the newly formed Hajjar/Kaufman (a spinoff of Dentsu) as their advertising agency. 

Most if not all of the notebooks in the Innova Book line were produced offshore by Taiwanese OEMs. Canon repeatedly turned to Chicony of Taipei, who lent their designs to Canon for their Innova Book 10 and Innova Book 200LS. The former, released in 1994, was a subnotebook four pounds in weight, while the latter, released in 1995, sported the largest screen of any laptop up to that point, at 11.3 inches diagonal. Canon Computer collaborated with IBM's Japanese subsidiary to produce the Canon NoteJet, a notebook computer with a built-in inkjet printer, introduced to market in 1993. In March 1994, Canon Computer took the reins of the NeXTstation after NeXT ceased manufacturing hardware in 1993. They later released the Object.Station, an x86-based workstation based on the NeXTstation design.

Although Canon Computer set a goal of $1 billion sales by 1997 in 1994, they were considered late newcomers to the market of personal computers. Innovas and Innova Books continued to be sold until January 1997, when the company quietly left the desktop and notebook market, citing poor sales. The subsidiary shifted its focus to silicon-on-insulator manufacturing, spending billion (US$25.8 million in 1997) to open up a clean room facility at Canon's plant in Hiratsuka, Tokyo. As part of this refocusing, Canon sold its existing shares of NeXT to Apple, who were in the process of acquiring that company after Jobs re-entered Apple in 1997. Canon Computer continued to sell printers, scanners and digital cameras until January 2001, when the subsidiary was restructured and renamed to Canon Digital Home and Personal Systems. Tsubota was replaced by Ryoichi Bamba.

Computers

Desktops

Notebooks

Innova

Subnotebooks

NoteJet

Other

Workstations

References

External links
 

American companies established in 1992
American companies disestablished in 2001
Computer Systems
Computer companies established in 1992
Computer companies disestablished in 2001
Defunct computer companies based in California
Defunct computer companies of the United States
Defunct computer hardware companies